Muhammad: Legacy of a Prophet is a PBS documentary film about the life of the Islamic prophet Muhammad based on historical records and on the stories of living American Muslims who call Muhammad the Messenger of God. It was produced in 2002 by Alex Kronemer and Michael Wolfe of Unity Productions Foundation and Kikim Media.

Content

The film takes viewers not only to the Arabian desert and ancient Middle Eastern sites where Muhammad's story unfolded, but also into the homes, mosques and workplaces of some of America's estimated 7 million Muslims to discover the many ways in which they follow Muhammad's example. Scholars on Islam provide historical context and critical perspective.

Appearances

Among the people in the film, the following are included:
 Karen Armstrong - Former nun, author on Abrahamic religions and 2008 TEDPrize winner
 John Voll - Professor of Islamic history, Georgetown University
 Seyyed Hossein Nasr - Professor of Islamic Literature, George Washington University, and a well-known Islamic scholar, honored at the United Nations
 Reuven Firestone - Scholar of Islam and Judaism, Hebrew Union College
 Daisy Khan - Executive director of ASMA Society and wife of Feisal Abdul Rauf
 M. Cherif Bassiouni - Professor of Law, DePaul University, 1999 Nobel Peace Prize nominee.
 Mohammed Zakariya - Muslim convert and master Arabic calligrapher
 Hamza Yusuf - Muslim convert and co-founder of Zaytuna College
 Michael Wolfe - Muslim convert and author of The Hadj
 Jameel Johnson - Muslim and Chief of Staff for Congressman Gregory Meeks
 Kevin James - Muslim convert, Supervising Fire Marshall from New York City Fire Department (arson investigator and 9/11 first responder)
 Najah Bazzy - Muslim Critical Care Nurse, Dearborn MI (Appears with her  husband, Ali, and daughter Nadia)
 Abdullah El-Amin - Local Imam
 Anwar al-Awlaki - Scholar, former Chaplain at George Washington University, former Imam in California and Washington D.C.  
 Sayed Hassan Al-Qazwini, the Imam of The Islamic Center of America and very respected Shia scholar

Funding

Funding for Muhammad: Legacy of a Prophet was provided by the Corporation for Public Broadcasting, The David and Lucile Packard Foundation, Arabian Bulk Trade, Sabadia Family Foundation, Irfan Kathwari Foundation, El-Hibri Foundation, Qureishi Family Trust, and many individual contributors.

Distribution
Muhammad was originally broadcast nationwide on December 18, 2002 on PBS and has since been rebroadcast on well over 600 individual PBS stations.  The United States viewership is estimated to be over 10 million.  The documentary received worldwide broadcast in many languages on National Geographic International in December 2003 and many other countries.

The film is used in communities, schools, universities, religious congregations, and civic organizations throughout the United States to increase Americans' understanding of Muslims and Islam.  Guides to facilitate discussions of the film's themes are available through the 20,000 Dialogues project and the Islam Project. The DVD of the film was re-issued in 2011 and includes the dialogue guide and lesson plans for teachers to use the film in the classroom.

See also
 List of Islamic films
 Depictions of Muhammad
 List of films about Muhammad
 Muhammad in Islam
 Alex Kronemer
 Michael Wolfe

References

External links
Muhammad: Legacy of a Prophet at PBS
Muhammad: Legacy of a Prophet at YouTube

Unity Productions Foundation

Films about Muhammad
PBS original programming
Documentary films about Islam
2002 in Islam
2002 films